The MTZ black hole, named after Cristian Martinez, Ricardo Troncoso and Jorge Zanelli, is a black hole solution for (3+1)-dimensional gravity with a minimally coupled self-interacting scalar field.

The event horizon is a surface of constant negative curvature, and the spacetime is asymptotically locally Anti-de-Sitter.

See also
 BTZ black hole

References 
 The original MTZ-paper 

Quantum gravity
Mathematical methods in general relativity
Black holes